The diving competition at the 2011 World Aquatics Championships was held between July 16–24, 2011 at the Shanghai Oriental Sports Center in Shanghai, China. Chinese divers dominated, winning all 10 gold medals.

Events 

The following events were contested by both men and women in Shanghai:

1 m springboard
3 m springboard
10 m platform
3 m springboard synchronized
10 m platform synchronized

Individual events consisted of preliminaries, semifinals and finals. The order of divers in the preliminary round were determined by computerized random selection, during the technical meeting. The 18 divers with the highest scores in the preliminaries proceeded to the semifinals.

The semifinal consisted of the top 18 ranked divers from the preliminary competition and the final consisted of the top 12 ranked divers from the semifinal.

Schedule

Medal table

Record(*)

Medal summary

Men

Women

References

 
Diving
Diving at the World Aquatics Championships
World Aquatics Championships